Ratanarat is a surname. Notable people with the surname include: 

Charng Ratanarat (1904–1993), Thai chemist, government official and entrepreneur
Chira Ratanarat (born 1940), CEO of the Siam Chemicals Public Company (SCC) 
Thongtip Ratanarat (born 1942), Thai chemical engineer

Thai-language surnames